Marana is a town in Pima County, Arizona, United States, located northwest of Tucson, with a small portion in Pinal County. According to the 2010 census, the population of the town is 34,961. From 1990 to 2000, Marana was the fourth fastest-growing place among all cities and towns of any size in Arizona.

History
Archaeologists have found evidence of about 4,200 years of continuous human settlement in the vicinity of Marana and in the middle of Santa Cruz Valley. Many significant archaeological sites have been found near Marana.
 Las Capas, a large, early agricultural site, is related to the nearby Costello-King site near present-day Ina Road and the Interstate 10 interchange.  It was occupied from 4,200 to 2,500 years ago.  It is the site of the oldest-known cemetery in the American Southwest and the oldest-known canals in North America. The oldest tobacco pipes in the world were found here.
 Los Morteros, a Hohokam ballcourt village ruin, is located on the Santa Cruz floodplain near the Point of the Mountain at the northern end of the Tucson Mountains. Los Morteros has also been identified as the probable location of the Llano del Azotado campsite used by the Juan Bautista de Anza expedition in 1775, which was chronicled. The location is near the present-day Arizona Portland Cement Plant in the Town of Marana.
 Linda Vista Hill, dating between 1200 and 1350 A.D., is a Trincheras culture site in the Tucson Mountains. The people inhabited mountain slopes overlooking arable land along streams.  The hillside site has more than 150 terraces and 75 pit houses excavated into the terraces. A massive, adobe-walled compound is located on the hill summit.
 Marana Mound, dating between 1150 and 1300 A.D., is the remnant of a large platform mound that was the center of the Hohokam community. The people lived between the Santa Cruz River and the Tortolita Mountains. The mound is surrounded by an adobe compound wall. Multiple rooms were constructed against the wall and were associated with 30–35 nearby residential compounds. Multiple house features have been found both inside and outside the compounds, as well as wall segments and trash mounds.  The whole complex covers an area of approximately one square mile.
 In 1775, Juan Bautista de Anza, Captain of the Presidio of Tubac, led an expedition north along the Santa Cruz River to find the city of San Francisco. His group of about 200 included 30 soldiers and their families and a number of escorts. They brought more than 1,000 heads of livestock. Their campsite was developed in the 20th century as the CalPortland Cement Plant near Marana. A  segment of the route that the expedition took through Marana is designated as part of the Juan Bautista de Anza National Historic Trail.
 Pointer Mountain Station, of the Butterfield Overland Mail stagecoach line used from 1858, was found during the study of Los Morteros, within the limits of the nearby Puerta del Norte trailer court.

Spanish colonists began to inhabit this area in the 17th and 18th centuries. Over time they intermarried with Native Americans, and a class of mestizo settlers also developed. From the early years, mining and ranching were the chief economic activities. The area became part of the independent Mexican Empire established in 1821 (soon replaced by the Republic of Mexico).

US territory
More than two decades later, the United States acquired this territory as part of the Gadsden Purchase; it was not part of the Mexican Cession following the defeat in the Mexican-American War, ending in 1848.

20th-century pioneers
According to historian David Leighton, Charles B. Anway was the first member of the Anway family in the Tucson area; from the eastern United States, he came because the dry mountain air was thought to be beneficial for people suffering from tuberculosis, as he was. Antibiotics were not yet in general use to treat this disease, which had a high mortality rate and no known cure. In 1919, his brother William and his two children, Louis and Ila, arrived in town, but they decided to settle in an area northwest of Tucson called Postvale, Arizona.

In 1920, the longtime widower William Anway married Orpha Ralston. She had been a member for many years of the Postvale Co-operative Women's Club. This group lobbied to have the local post office renamed from Postvale to Marana; in time, the town was also named Marana.

Marana did not become developed primarily as an agricultural center, until after World War I. It has produced commodity crops of cotton, wheat, barley, alfalfa, and pecans.

During World War II, the Army built facilities here to support the military effort. Before the Air Force was established, the Army built and operated the Marana Airfield (1942–45). It became the largest pilot-training center in the world, training some 10,000 flyers.

In the postwar years, five Titan missile sites were constructed in the area as part of a complex of ballistic missile installations built around Tucson. This was during the Cold War when tensions were high with the Soviet Union.

In early 1979, the town began to grow through a targeted annexation policy.

Annexation
The southern portion of Marana has grown considerably since the early 1990s, with the addition of businesses and some housing. This is largely due to the annexation of existing unincorporated areas. In 1992, the Marana Town Council voted to annex an area of unincorporated Pima County that was located southeast of the town limits. The area selected was a narrow corridor of land along Interstate 10, to the east along Ina Road, and south along Thornydale Road. These areas were mainly developed as high-density commercial businesses and shopping centers, including large retailers or "big box" stores such as Super KMart (now closed), Costco Wholesale, Target, and Home Depot. Marana chose these areas to annex to increase its revenue from sales taxes.  The large residential areas behind these commercial areas, which required support for residents, such as schools and roads, were not annexed.

As a result, the city of Tucson filed a lawsuit in the Superior Court of the State of Arizona in and for the County of Pima (City of Tucson v Town of Marana), claiming that Marana illegally annexed the unincorporated areas in violation of existing state laws. However, on April 4, 1994, Judge Lina Rodriguez ruled in favor of Marana, allowing the annexation to stand. Following this suit, the Arizona State annexation laws were changed, forbidding municipalities from annexing small strips of land without taking large surrounding parcels as well. Such "strip annexation" is no longer allowed under Arizona law.

Geography
Marana is located at  (32.386539, -111.125437).

According to the United States Census Bureau, the town has a total area of 121.4 square miles (313.6 km2), of which 120.7 square miles (312.3 km2)  is land and 0.7 square miles (1.9 km2)  (1.22%) is water.

The town extends along Interstate 10 from the line between Pinal and Pima counties to the Tucson city line, except for the area around the non-affluent unincorporated community of Rillito. The town has a history of farming and ranching. The Tucson Mountains and the western half of Saguaro National Park are located to the south. Phoenix is approximately 90 minutes north via Interstate 10.

Climate
Marana has a hot semi-arid climate (Köppen climate classification BSh). This is characterized by hot summers and relatively mild winters. The area averages only 12.19 inches (310 mm) of annual rainfall. During the dry and sunny winter months, daytime highs usually reach between 60°F and 70°F (16°C and 21°C), with temperatures cooling to well below 50°F (10°C), and sometimes below 40°F (4°C) during the night. Temperatures below the freezing mark are not uncommon during this period. In the summer, high temperatures range between 95°F and 105°F (35°C and 41°C), with nights cooling down to around 70°F (21°C). The occasional heat wave can cause temperatures to soar above 110°F (43°C) for multiple days during the hot summer months. Rain is much more frequent during the summer due to the North American Monsoon, and is sometimes accompanied by high winds and thunderstorms.

Demographics

As of the census of 2010, there were 34,961 people, 11,759 households, and 8,871 families residing in the town. There were 13,706 housing units and the racial makeup of the town was 81.9% White, 4.6% Black or African American, 0.7% Native American, 5.2% Asian, 0.1% Pacific Islander, 9.7% from other races, and 2.2% from two or more races.  21.7% of the population were Hispanic or Latino of any race.

There were 11,759 households, out of which 32.5% had children under the age of 18 living with them, 63.2% were married couples living together, 8.2% had a female householder with no husband present, and 24.6% were non-families. 19.3% of all households were made up of individuals, and 5.1% had someone living alone who was 65 years of age or older. The average household size was 2.81, and the average family size was 3.17.

In the town, the population was spread out, with 26.7% under the age of 18, 7.4% from 18 to 24, 34.3% from 25 to 44, 22.1% from 45 to 64, and 9.5% who were 65 years of age or older.  The median age was 37 years. The Town is 50.1% female and 49.9% male.

The median income for a household in the town was $68,361, and the median income for a family was $75,281. Males had a median income of $58,932 versus $37,388 for females. The per capita income for the town was $28,468. About 6.1% of families and 8.1% of the population were below the poverty line, including 15.0% of those under age 18 and 2.3% of those aged 65 or over.

Economy
Asarco's Silver Bell mine is located near Marana.

Principal employers
According to Marana's 2018 Comprehensive Annual Financial Report, the principal employers in the city are;

Transportation
Marana is served by Sun Shuttle service to Tucson.

Town facts

 Marana was named for the Spanish word maraña ("thicket") by 19th-century railroad workers who had to clear a line through the area.
 In 2007, Marana began hosting the PGA Tour's WGC-Accenture Match Play Championship (now the WGC-Cadillac Match Play Championship). Held in late February, the event included the world's top 64 professional golfers. Henrik Stenson won the inaugural event, and Tiger Woods won in 2008. Geoff Ogilvy won the 2009 event. Ian Poulter won the 2010 event and Luke Donald took the 2011 title. The tournament remained in Marana through 2014. (In September 2014, Cadillac was announced as the new title sponsor for 2015, and the event was moved to San Francisco's TPC Harding Park golf course.)
 Pinal Airpark (Evergreen International Aviation) is located just north of Marana in Pinal County.  Many commercial airlines send their airplanes to this site for storage. It was well known in the 1970s and 1980s as an air base for the CIA.  The airport was said to be a U.S. Forest Service air tanker base, but when a series of forest fires broke out in the mountains surrounding Tucson in the early 1970s, Airpark officials had to admit that these places were not Forest Service tankers. Locals had asked for them to put out the fires.  Airpark officials said these were actually paramilitary cargo planes. Access to the Airpark is stringently monitored.
 Marana Regional Airport was purchased by the town from Pima County in 1999. It does not serve commercial airlines. Residents use the Tucson International Airport for commercial flights to other cities and areas.

Veterans Cemetery
Marana is home to one of the four Arizona state Veterans Memorial Cemeteries. Since it was developed in 2016 by the Arizona Department of Veterans' Services over 2,450 burials have been undertaken.

Education
Marana has a public school system consisting of 16 schools, which are coordinated by the Marana Unified School District.  Flowing Wells Unified School District coordinates the education in the municipality's extreme southeastern section. Additionally, the portion of the town within Pinal County is served by Red Rock Elementary School and Santa Cruz Valley Unified High.

References

External links

 
 Marana News – local newspaper
 "Pioneering People on a Corridor of Change: Marana’s Cultural Heritage", 26 March 2012
 Cultural and Historic Resource Acquisitions, Los Morteros accessed from Pima County website

Populated places established in 1977
Towns in Pima County, Arizona
Populated places in the Sonoran Desert
Butterfield Overland Mail in New Mexico Territory
1977 establishments in Arizona
Cemeteries in Arizona
Stagecoach stops in the United States